Frederick Franklin "Clancy" Tyler (December 16, 1891 – October 14, 1945) was a Major League Baseball player. He played one season with the Boston Braves in 1914.

References

External links

Boston Braves players
Major League Baseball catchers
1891 births
1945 deaths
Baseball players from New Hampshire
People from Derry, New Hampshire
Jersey City Skeeters players
Sportspeople from Rockingham County, New Hampshire
Syracuse Stars (minor league baseball) players
Worcester Busters players
Worcester Boosters players
Waterbury Brasscos players